Sonnet 148 is one of 154 sonnets written by the English playwright and poet William Shakespeare.

It is considered a Dark Lady sonnet, as are all from 127 to 152.

Structure 
Sonnet 148 is an English or Shakespearean sonnet. The English sonnet has three quatrains, followed by a final rhyming couplet. It follows the typical rhyme scheme of the form ABAB CDCD EFEF GG and is composed in iambic pentameter, a type of poetic metre based on five pairs of metrically weak/strong syllabic positions. The 13th line exemplifies a regular iambic pentameter:

×  /  ×    /     ×    /      ×   /       ×   / 
O cunning Love! with tears thou keep'st me blind, (148.13)
/ = ictus, a metrically strong syllabic position. × = nonictus.

Line 2 exhibits a rightward movement of the fourth ictus (resulting in a four-position figure, × × / /, sometimes referred to as a minor ionic), and line 3 has a mid-line reversal and (potentially) and initial reversal:

  ×    /    ×  /  ×  /  ×     ×     /   / 
Which have no correspondence with true sight!

/   ×    ×   /      /   ×   ×  /    ×     / 
Or, if they have, where is my judgement fled, (148.2-3)

Initial reversals also potentially occur in lines 7, 8, and 11, with a potential mid-line reversal in line 1. Potential minor ionics occur in lines 6, 9, 10, and 14.

Notes

References

External links
 Shakespeare's Sonnets online

British poems
Sonnets by William Shakespeare